Lists of railway accidents that have occurred in each state and territory of Australia are contained in the following articles:

 Railway accidents in New South Wales
 Railway accidents in the Northern Territory
 Railway accidents in Queensland
 Railway accidents in South Australia
 Railway accidents in Tasmania
 Railway accidents in Victoria
 Railway accidents in Western Australia